Charles VIII of France also known by the longer title The History Of Charles The Eighth Of France; Or, The Invasion Of Naples Of The French is a 1671 tragedy by the English writer John Crowne. It is based on the reign of Charles VIII of France and particularly his Italian War of the 1490s.

It was first performed at the Dorset Garden Theatre by the Duke's Company with a cast that included Thomas Betterton as Charles the Eighth, Matthew Medbourne as Alphonso, Henry Harris as Ferdinand, William Smith as  Prince of Salerne, John Young as Ascanio, Samuel Sandford as Trivultio, Philip Cademan as Ghost, John Crosby as Lewis, Henry Norris as Mompensier, Mary Betterton as Isabella, Margaret Osborne as Cornelia, Elinor Dixon as Julia and Anne Shadwell as Irene.

References

Bibliography
 Van Lennep, W. The London Stage, 1660-1800: Volume One, 1660-1700. Southern Illinois University Press, 1960.

1671 plays
West End plays
Tragedy plays
Plays by John Crowne
Plays set in the 15th century
Plays set in France
Cultural depictions of French kings